Blastobasis echus is a moth in the  family Blastobasidae. It is found in Costa Rica.

The length of the forewings is 4.1–8.5 mm. The forewings have brownish-grey scales tipped with pale brownish grey intermixed with brownish-grey scales and pale brownish-grey scales. The hindwings are translucent pale brown.

Etymology
The specific epithet is derived from Latin echo which has the same meaning as the English word.

References

Moths described in 2013
Blastobasis